Tyco may refer to:

 Tyco International, a diversified industrial conglomerate
 TE Connectivity, formerly Tyco Electronics, a former segment of Tyco International
 Tyco Solarlok, a type of electrical connector widely known as "the Tyco connector"
 Tyco Toys, a division of Mattel
 Tyco Federal Credit Union, a credit union for employees of Tyco International, TE Connectivity and Covidien
 Ty Inc., maker of Beanie Babies

See also
 Taiko (disambiguation)
 Tycho (disambiguation)